Carlo Colonna (1665–1739) was a Roman Catholic cardinal.

Biography
Carlo Colonna was born on November 17, 1665 in Rome, Italy, the third child of Lorenzo Onofrio Colonna, prince and duke of Paliano, and Maria Mancini, niece of Cardinal Jules Raymond Mazarin.

References 

1665 births
1739 deaths
18th-century Italian cardinals
Colonna family